Allobates insperatus is a species of frog in the family Aromobatidae. It is endemic to Amazonian slopes of eastern Ecuador; its range, however, extends to near the Colombian border and it may occur in that country too.
It inhabits leaf-litter in forest. It breeds in bracts of palms on the ground and other small, ephemeral pools. Its habitat is threatened by agriculture, logging, and oil exploration.

References

insperatus
Amphibians of Ecuador
Endemic fauna of Ecuador
Taxonomy articles created by Polbot
Amphibians described in 2000